Tatlı (also, Tatly) is a village and municipality in the Samukh Rayon of Azerbaijan.  It has a population of 926.

References 

Populated places in Samukh District